Tulguzbash (Tölgöźbaş) is a rural locality (a village) in Askinsky Selsoviet, Askinsky District, Bashkortostan, Russia. The population was 265 as of 2010. There are 6 streets.

Geography 
Tulguzbash is located 19 km north of Askino (the district's administrative centre) by road. Bolshoye Ozero is the nearest rural locality.

References 

Rural localities in Askinsky District